More Than Two: A Practical Guide to Ethical Polyamory  is a non-fiction book about consensual non-monogamous relationships, written by Franklin Veaux and Eve Rickert. The foreword to the first printing was written by Janet Hardy, co-author of The Ethical Slut. A new foreword by Jessica Fern, author of Polysecure, was added to the eighth printing in 2022. The book shares the same name as, but no content with, Veaux's website MoreThanTwo.com, which he launched in 1997 under the name Xeromag as a resource about polyamory.

Reception 
More Than Two received positive reviews within polyamorous communities upon publication. The book was a finalist in the Family & Relationships category for the 2014 Indiefab Awards (later rebranded as the Foreword INDIES).

Criticism 
In 2019, a group of Veaux's former partners and others, including More Than Two co-author Rickert and three of the women whom Veaux had told personal stories about in More Than Two and in Veaux's memoir, The Game Changer, went public describing abusive and coercive behaviors from Veaux over the course of their relationships with him. The accusations led to a critical analysis of both books by author Kali Tal, who has published extensively regarding psychological trauma and abuse. 

Rickert then published further criticisms of More Than Two on her own blog, detailing how after collaborating with journalist Louisa Leontiades to collate the previously referenced personal stories of hers and others experiences that were used in the book, and her subsequent correspondence between herself, Tal and the other people whose stories had been collated in the lead up to Tal's critical analyses, she had come to understand through both the collated personal stories and through Tal's subsequent analyses, how prominent ideas within More Than Two had developed directly out of the referenced harmful, traumatising aspects of her and others relationships with Veaux, describing with those criticisms as reference how the book itself may "for some, become a tool of abuse". She then further criticized passages of More Than Two after reviewing the text herself since having Leontiades and Tal's works available, whilst noting they along with an exposé into the cult NXIVM and a detailed description by an essayist on what impact the prominent ideas in the book had on their own experiences, were descriptive of how parts of the book are "harmful" and may cause harm to others.

References

2014 non-fiction books
Sexual ethics books
Polyamory
Sex positivism
Sexual fidelity
Collaborative non-fiction books